Neuron derived neurotrophic factor is a protein that in humans is encoded by the NDNF gene.

References

Further reading